Oman participated at the 2018 Asian Para Games which was held in Jakarta, Indonesia from 6 to 13 October 2018. Mansoor al Touqi, president of the Oman Paralympic Committee, was the chef-de-mission of the delegation. All its 9 athletes which consists of 5 men and 4 women participated in athletics. The team also consists of coaches, a physical therapist, and officials.

Medalists

Medals by sport

Medals by day

See also
 Oman at the 2018 Asian Games

References

Nations at the 2018 Asian Para Games
2018 in Omani sport